A large sack containing homemade bombs exploded in Monguno, Borno State, Nigeria, killing at least 12 people, and possibly as many as 63. It happened at a camp which jihadist group Boko Haram had abandoned. They also carried out major attacks in Monguno in September 2015 and June 2020.

References

2015 murders in Nigeria
2010s in Borno State
2010s massacres in Nigeria
Boko Haram bombings
Improvised explosive device bombings in 2015
Islamic terrorist incidents in 2015
Monguno bombing
Monguno bombing
Mass murder in 2015
Mass murder in Borno State
Terrorist incidents in Borno State
Terrorist incidents in Nigeria in 2015